Idham is an Indonesian and Malaysian name. Notable people with the name include:

Given name
Idham Azis (born 1963), Indonesian police general
Idham Chalid (1921–2010), Indonesian politician and minister

Middle name
Very Idham Henyansyah (born 1978), Indonesian convicted serial killer, also known as Ryan
Khairul Idham Pawi (born 1998), Malaysian motorcycle racer

Surname
Ahmad Idham (born 1974), Malaysian actor, director, and producer